The 1971 Chattanooga Moccasins football team was an American football team that represented the University of Tennessee at Chattanooga during the 1971 NCAA College Division football season. In their fourth year under head coach Harold Wilkes, the team compiled a 2–9 record.

Schedule

References

Chattanooga
Chattanooga Mocs football seasons
Chattanooga Moccasins football